Lamnostoma is a genus of eels in the snake eel family Ophichthidae. It currently contains the following species:
 Lamnostoma kampeni (M. C. W. Weber & de Beaufort, 1916) (Freshwater snake-eel)
 Lamnostoma mindora (D. S. Jordan & R. E. Richardson, 1908)
 Lamnostoma orientalis (McClelland, 1844) (Oriental worm-eel)
 Lamnostoma polyophthalma (Bleeker, 1853) (Ocellated sand-eel)
 Lamnostoma taylori (Herre, 1923)

References

 

Ophichthidae